Santa Pelagia is an Italian-language oratorio by Alessandro Stradella. The subject of the piece is Pelagia of Antioch, a courtesan in Asia Minor who repented and became a hermit on the Mount of Olives. 
Musical sources are thought to come from posthumous performances in Modena in 1688, six years after the death of the composer. 10 years after this another composer Marc'Antonio Ziani made the only other known oratorio on this subject.

Cast
Pelagia - soprano
Nonno - bishop Nonnus, tenor, who tries to convince Pelagia to repent
Religione - personification of religion, alto
Mondo - personification of the world, bass
Chorus

Recording
The work was recorded by musicologist Andrea De Carlo and Ensemble Mare Nostrum in 2016.

References

Compositions by Alessandro Stradella